Marienehe Charterhouse, also sometimes referred to as Rostock Charterhouse (Kartause Himmelszinnen or Kartause Rostock), was a Carthusian monastery, or charterhouse, in Marienehe, now a suburb of Rostock in Mecklenburg-Vorpommern, Germany.

The monastery was noted for the extent to which it favoured university education for its monks and the mystical writings the community produced, particularly under the priors Heinrich Eler, Vicco Dessin and Heinrich von Ribnitz.

The stone was mostly put to use in the construction of Schloss Güstrow.

There are no visible remains. The site was later used for the construction of the Heinkel works, and after the war for the Rostock Fischkombinat ("fishery centre"). A block of flats now stands here.

Notes

Sources and external links
 Lorenz, Sönke, Potkowski, Edward, Schlegel, Gerhard et al., 2002: Bücher, Bibliotheken und Schriftkultur der Kartäuser: Festgabe zum 65. Geburtstag von Edward Potkowski. Franz Steiner Verlag  available at googlebooks.co.uk 
 Schlegel, Gerhard: Die vergessene Kartause Marienehe bei Rostock (1396–1552). Analecta Cartusiana 116/4, 1989, pp. 119–151 
 Nordisk tidskrift för bok- och biblioteksväsen / Årg. XXII. 1935 /151 Projekt Runeberg 

Buildings and structures in Rostock
Carthusian monasteries in Germany
Monasteries in Mecklenburg-Western Pomerania
Religious organizations established in the 1390s
Christian monasteries established in the 14th century
Religious organizations disestablished in 1552